Cas or Tál Cas was the eponymous ancestor and dynastic founder of the Dál gCais (Deisi Tuaiscirt) from whom all the branches claim common descent.

Life
He was the son of Conall Eachluath and his wife Coirpthe, daughter of Eochaid Mugmedon. He acquired the nickname Tál (adze) as he was the foster son of a wright. He became King of Thomond and made a gavel of his territory among his thirteen sons. On his death the kingship of Thomond passed to his eldest son Blait.

Family

He had thirteen sons, at least three of which would found substantial lineages whose descendants would rule as lords over substantial territories:
 Blod (Uí Bhloid)
Carthann Fionn
Oenghus (Uí Óengussa)
Uí Ronghaile
Uí Chearnaigh
 Eochaidh Bailldearg
Uí Floinn
Uí Thoirdhealbhach
Ua Briain
Ua Cinnéidigh
Ua hEachthighearn
 Caisín (Ua Caisin)
Eochaidh
Cinéal nDúnghaile
 Sineall
Uí Dhobharchon
Carthann
Clan Cuiléin
 Eoghan mac Cuiléin
Clan Cuiléin Uachtarach
 Maol Cluiche mac Cuiléin
Mac Conmara
Ua hAllmharain
Ua hArtagain
 Aonghus Ceann-nathrach
 Cinéal Fermaic
Ua Deághaidh
 Cinéal gCuallachtaigh
Ó Gríobhtha
 Cinéal mBaoi
 Aonghus Ceann-aitinn
 Clann Ifeamain
 Clann Neachtain
 Lughaidh/Dealbhaoth
 na Dealbhna
 Muinnter Chochláin
 Carthann
 Dal gCais Leithe Lachtmhuighe
 Aedh
 Ui Aedha
 Lughaidh Éile
 Muinnter Dhobharchon
 Muinnter Chonraoi
 Muinnter Chearnaigh 
 Muinnter Aonghusa
 Muinnter Dhubhthaigh
 Séadna
 Cormac
 Caindeach
 Nae
 Loisceann

DNA
Surnames purported to be of Dalcassian origin have a statistically significant correlation with the possession of the Y-DNA signature R-L226 and thus this mutation is believed to be associated with their ancestral founder.

References

Dál gCais